Pterolophia kaleea is a species of beetle in the family Cerambycidae. It was described by Henry Walter Bates in 1866, originally under the genus Praonetha.

Subspecies
 Pterolophia kaleea kaleea (Bates, 1866)
 Pterolophia kaleea inflexa Gressitt, 1940

References

kaleea
Beetles described in 1866